Dibamus ingeri is a species of legless lizard in the family Dibamidae. The species is endemic to Borneo.

Etymology
The specific name, ingeri, is in honor of American herpetologist Robert F. Inger.

References

Further reading
Das, Indraneil; Lim, Kelvin K. P. (2003). "Two new species of Dibamus (Squamata: Dibamidae) from Borneo". Raffles Bull. Zool. 51 (1): 137–141. (Dibamus ingeri, new species).

Dibamus
Reptiles of Indonesia
Reptiles of Malaysia
Reptiles described in 2003
Reptiles of Borneo